= István Ordódy =

Vice-palatine of Hungary
- Reign: 1647
- Noble family: Ordódy
- Spouse: Borbála Apponyi
- Issue: Gáspár; Magdolna; Zsigmond; Róza; László; Katalin; Mihály; Borbála; Erzsébet
- Father: Gáspár Ordódy
- Mother: Dorottya Madocsányi

István Ordódy de Ordód et Alsólieszkó (Hungarian: ordódi és alsólieszkói Ordódy István, Latin: Stephanus Ordody) was a Hungarian influential lord, vice-palatine of Hungary in the 17th century.

István House of Ordódy
Political offices
Preceded by ?	Vice-palatine of Hungary; 1647 (?)	Succeeded by ?
